Artem Kozakevych (born 2 October 1992) is a Ukrainian handball player for CS Minaur Baia Mare and the Ukrainian national team.

He represented Ukraine at the 2020 European Men's Handball Championship.

References

1992 births
Living people
Ukrainian male handball players
People from Novovolynsk
HC Motor Zaporizhia players
Sportspeople from Volyn Oblast
21st-century Ukrainian people